Flavia Pennetta was the defending champion, but lost in the quarterfinals to Sabine Lisicki.

Simona Halep won the title, defeating Jelena Janković in the final 2–6, 7–5, 6–4.

This tournament also marked Serena Williams' return to Indian Wells for the first time since 2001, where she won the tournament by defeating Kim Clijsters in the final. Both Serena and Venus Williams boycotted the tournament due to racism surrounding Venus' withdrawal before their semifinal match.

Seeds
All seeds received a bye into the second round.

Draw

Finals

Top half

Section 1

Section 2

Section 3

Section 4

Bottom half

Section 5

Section 6

Section 7

Section 8

Qualifying

Seeds

Qualifiers

Qualifying draw

First qualifier

Second qualifier

Third qualifier

Fourth qualifier

Fifth qualifier

Sixth qualifier

Seventh qualifier

Eighth qualifier

Ninth qualifier

Tenth qualifier

Eleventh qualifier

Twelfth qualifier

References

External Links
 Main Draw
 Qualifying Draw

2015 WTA Tour
Women's Singles